KUZZ (550 kHz) and KUZZ-FM (107.9 MHz) are American radio stations licensed to serve Bakersfield, California, United States. The stations are owned by Buck Owens Production Company (which is controlled by the estate of country star Buck Owens) and the licenses are held by Owens One Company Inc.

They broadcast a simulcast country music format to the inland central California region. KUZZ's radio signals can extend over 100 miles, from Los Angeles on some nights to Fresno with a little better audio in the north, all away to Barstow in the Mojave Desert and to Santa Maria by the Pacific Ocean.

KUZZ was also the call sign of television station channel 45 which Owens owned at one time. It is now Justice Network affiliate KUVI.

KUZZ was KAFY on 1490 kHz in 1947. It moved to 550 kHz in 1950.

History
In 1958, KUZZ (then KIKK) first began broadcasting a country music format on 800 AM. In 1960, the station manager, a local country and western star named "Cousin" Herb Henson, changed the calls to KUZZ. In 1966, country music singer Buck Owens purchased the station and kept the country format. One year later in 1967, Owens also purchased the 107.9 frequency. When Owens purchased the frequency, he did not actually start playing country music. He started it out as an alternative rock station. The calls letters for the new 107.9 would be KBBY-FM.

In 1969 after low ratings at 107.9, Owens flipped the station to country and western and changed the call letters to KZIN-FM. KUZZ and KZIN were sister stations and both played a country format but KZIN differed from KUZZ by playing more new country than KUZZ. In 1977, plans were made to purchase rival country station AM 970 KBIS. During that same time 800 AM was being sold to the Church of the Foursquare Gospel, which was headquartered in Los Angeles. The plan for 800 AM was to flip the format from country to a Christian format.

In January 1977, 107.9 KZIN-FM flipped formats from country to an album oriented rock station. The first song on the new 107.9 was "New Kid In Town" by the Eagles. The new calls letters were KKXX-FM. At this time, 970 AM KUZZ became a full-time 24-hour country station (before then, it had been known as a "daytimer" and would only broadcast during the day and turn off at night). In 1984, Buck Owens increased the power of KUZZ to 5,000 watts and also purchased another AM country radio station, 550 KAFY.

A couple years later, management at the station 970 AM KUZZ and 550 KAFY, decided to exchange facilities. With music formats on the decline on the AM band, people were not listening to AM radio as in previous generations. In 1988, after competitors were saying they would bring country music to the FM dial, Owens decided to do that as well. He flipped rock station 107.9 KKXX to contemporary country KUZZ-FM. The logo of the station is an artist impression of Owens' famous red, white, and blue guitar, which he used throughout most of his career.

References

External links
 KUZZ official website

 

 

Country radio stations in the United States
Radio stations established in 1958
UZZ
1958 establishments in California